Metrication or metrification is the act or process of converting to the metric system of measurement. All over the world, countries have transitioned from local and traditional units of measurement to the metric system. This process began in France during the 1790s, and is still continuing more than 200 years later, with the modern International System of Units, as the metric system has not yet been fully adopted in all countries and areas.

Overview
Most countries now have the metric system as their official system of weights and measures. Some have adopted it as their official system but have not yet completed the process of metrication. Some others have not made any commitment to adopting it. There is not a general consensus in the sources as to the number of countries that fall into each of these categories.

According to a 2011 doctoral dissertation by Hector Vera, as of 2010, a total of seven countries had not "adopted the metric system as their exclusive system of measurement". They are: the Federated States of Micronesia, Liberia, the Marshall Islands, Myanmar, Palau, Samoa and the United States. According to the U.S. Central Intelligence Agency's online The World Factbook (2016), the only countries that have not adopted the metric system are Myanmar (also known as Burma), Liberia, and the United States. According to Vera, the United States (and its associated states: the Federated States of Micronesia, Marshall Islands, and Palau) is a non-metric country. According to a Liberian journalist, Liberia uses U.S. customary units, but is committed to adopting the metric system in the future. According to Vera, Samoa has never officially adopted the metric system, owing to a lack of resources and expertise. The government of Myanmar has stated that the country had a metrication goal of completion by 2019. Both Myanmar and Liberia are substantially metric countries, trading internationally in metric units.

Some countries, such as Guyana, adopted the metric system but have had some trouble over time implementing it. Antigua and Barbuda, also "officially" metric, is moving toward total implementation of the metric system but more slowly than expected. The government had announced that they have plans to convert their country to the metric system by the first quarter of 2015. Other Caribbean countries such as Saint Lucia are officially metric but are still in the process toward full conversion.  In the United Kingdom the metric system is the official system for most regulated trading by weight or measure purposes but some imperial units remain the primary official unit of measurement. , the UK has only partially adopted the metric system.

The European Union used the Units of Measure Directive to attempt to achieve a common system of weights and measures and to facilitate the European Single Market. Throughout the 1990s, the European Commission helped accelerate the process for member countries to complete their metric conversion processes. Among them was the United Kingdom, where laws in some or all contexts mandate or permit many imperial measures, such as miles and yards for road-sign distances, road speed limits in miles per hour, pints of beer, and inches for clothes. The United Kingdom secured permanent exemptions for the mile and yard in road markings, and (with Ireland) for the pint (Imperial) of draught beer sold in pubs (see Metrication in the United Kingdom). In 2007, the European Commission also announced that (to appease British public opinion and to facilitate trade with the United States) it was to abandon the requirement for metric-only labelling on packaged goods, and to allow dual metric–imperial marking to continue indefinitely.

The United States, the United Kingdom, and Canada have some active opposition to metrication, particularly where updated weights and measures laws would make historic systems of measurement obsolete.

Before the metric system

The Roman empire used the pes (foot) measure. This was divided into 12 unciae ("inches"). The libra ("pound") was another measure that had wide effect on European weight and currency long after Roman times, e.g. lb, £. The measure came to vary greatly over time. Charlemagne was one of several rulers who launched reform programmes of various kinds to standardise units for measure and currency in his empire, but there was no real general breakthrough.

In medieval Europe, local laws on weights and measures were set by trade guilds on a city-by-city basis. For example, the ell or elle was a unit of length commonly used in Europe, but its length varied from 40.2 centimetres in one part of Germany to 70 centimetres in The Netherlands and 94.5 centimetres in Edinburgh. A survey of Switzerland in 1838 revealed that the foot had 37 different regional variations, the ell had 68, there were 83 different measures for dry grain, 70 measures for fluids and 63 different measures for "dead weights". When Isaac Newton wrote Philosophiae Naturalis Principia Mathematica in 1687, he quoted his measurements in Parisian feet so readers could understand the size. Examples of efforts to have local intercity or national standards for measurements include the Scottish law of 1641, and the British standard imperial system of 1824, which is still commonly used in the United Kingdom. Imperial China had at one time successfully standardised units for volume throughout its territory, but by 1936 official investigations uncovered 53 values for the chi varying from 200 millimetres to 1250 millimetres; 32 values of the cheng, between 500 millilitres and 8 litres; and 36 different tsin ranging from 300 grams to 2,500 grams.  Revolutionary France was to produce what evolved into the definitive International System of Units, which has come to be used by most of the world today.

The desire for a single international system of measurement came largely from increasing international trade and the need to apply common standards to goods. For a company to buy a product produced in another country, they needed to know that the product would arrive as described. The medieval ell was abandoned in part because its value was not standardised. One primary advantage of the International System of Units (SI) is simply that it is international, and the pressure on countries to conform to it grew as it became increasingly the international standard. It also simplifies the teaching and learning of measurement as all SI units are based on a handful of base units (in particular, the metre, kilogram and second cover the majority of everyday measurements), using decimal prefixes to cover all magnitudes. This contrasts with pre-metric units, which largely have names that do not relate directly to one another (e.g. inch, foot, yard, mile) and are related to one another by inconsistent ratios which must be memorised (e.g. 12, 3, 1760). As the values in an SI expression are always decimal (i.e. without vulgar fractions) and mixed units (such as "feet and inches") are not used with SI, measurements are easy to add and multiply. Scientific measurement and calculation are greatly simplified as the units for electricity, force etc. are part of the SI system and hence are all interrelated in a coherent manner (e.g. 1 J = 1 kg·m2·s−2 = 1 V·A·s). Standardisation of measures has contributed significantly to the industrial revolution and technological development in general. SI is not the only example of international standardisation; several powerful international standardisation organisations exist for various industries, such as the International Organization for Standardization (ISO), the International Electrotechnical Commission (IEC), and the International Telecommunication Union (ITU).

Forerunners
Decimal numbers are an essential part of the metric system, with only one base unit and multiples created on the decimal base, the figures remain the same. This simplifies calculations. Although the Indians used decimal numbers for mathematical computations, it was Simon Stevin who in 1585 first advocated the use of decimal numbers for everyday purposes in his booklet De Thiende (Middle Dutch for 'The Tenth').  He also declared that it would only be a matter of time before decimal numbers were used for currencies and measurements. His notation for decimal fractions was clumsy, but this was overcome with the introduction of the decimal point, generally attributed to Bartholomaeus Pitiscus who used this notation in his trigonometrical tables (1595).

In 1670, Gabriel Mouton published a proposal that was in essence similar to Wilkins' proposal, except that his base unit of length would have been 1/1,000 of a minute of arc (about 1.852 m) of geographical latitude.  He proposed calling this unit the virga.  Rather than using different names for each unit of length, he proposed a series of names that had prefixes, rather like the prefixes found in SI.

In 1790, Thomas Jefferson submitted a report to the United States Congress in which he proposed the adoption of a decimal system of coinage and of weights and measures. This would have equated to 11.755 English inches (29.8 cm) or 13.06 English inches (33.1 cm). Like Wilkins, the names that he proposed for multiples and subunits of his base units of measure were the names of units of measure that were in use at the time. The great interest in geodesy during this era, and the measurement system ideas that developed, influenced how the continental US was surveyed and parceled. The story of how Jefferson's full vision for the new measurement system came close to displacing the Gunter chain and the traditional acre but ended up not doing so, is explored in Andro Linklater's Measuring America.

History of adoption 

The metre was adopted as exclusive measure in 1801 under the French Consulate, then the First French Empire until 1812, when Napoleon decreted the introduction of the mesures usuelles which remained in use in France up to 1840 in the reign of Louis Philippe. Meanwhile, the metre was adopted by the Republic of Geneva. After the joining of canton of Geneva to Switzerland in 1815, Guillaume Henri Dufour published the first Swiss official map for which the metre was adopted as unit of length. A Swiss-French binational officer, Louis Napoléon Bonaparte was present when a baseline was measured near Zürich for Dufour map which would win the gold medal for the national map at the Exposition Universelle of 1855. Among the scientific instruments calibrated on the metre, which were displayed at the Exposition Universelle, was Brunner apparatus, a geodetic instrument devised for measuring the central baseline of Spain whose designer, Carlos Ibáñez e Ibáñez de Ibero would represent Spain at the International Statistical Institute. In addition of the Exposition Universelle and the second Statistical Congress held in Paris, an International Association for obtaining a uniform decimal system of measures, weights, and coins was created there in 1855. Copies of the Spanish standard would be made for Egypt, France and Germany. These standards were compared to each other and with Borda apparatus which was the main reference for measuring all geodetic baselines in France. These comparisons were essential, because of the expansibility of solid materials with raise in temperature. Indeed, one fact had constantly dominated all the fluctuations of ideas on the measurement of geodesic bases: it was the constant concern to accurately assess the temperature of standards in the field; and the determination of this variable, on which depended the length of the instrument of measurement, had always been considered by geodesists as so difficult and so important that one could almost say that the history of measuring instruments is almost identical with that of the precautions taken to avoid temperature errors. In 1867, the second general Conference of the European Arc Measurement recommended the adoption of the metre in replacement of the toise. In 1869, the Saint Petersburg Academy of Sciences sent to the French Academy of Sciences a report drafted by Otto Wilhelm von Struve, Heinrich von Wild and Moritz von Jacobi inviting his French counterpart to undertake joint action with a view to ensuring the universal use of the metric system in all scientific work. The same year, Napoleon III convened the International Metre Commission which was to meet in Paris in 1870. The Franco-Prussian War broke out, the Second French Empire collapsed, but the metre survived.

During the nineteenth century the metric system of weights and measures proved a convenient political compromise during the unification processes in the Netherlands, Germany and Italy. In 1814, Portugal became the second country not part of the French Empire to officially adopt the metric system. Spain found it expedient in 1849 to follow the French example and within a decade Latin America had also adopted the metric system, or had already adopted the system, such as the case of Chile by 1848. There was considerable resistance to metrication in the United Kingdom and in the United States, despite these were actually the first country in the World to use a metric standard for cartography.

France
The introduction of the metric system into France in 1795 was done on a district by district basis with Paris being the first district. By modern standards the transition was poorly managed. Although thousands of pamphlets were distributed, the Agency of Weights and Measures who oversaw the introduction underestimated the work involved. Paris alone needed 500,000 metre sticks, yet one month after the metre became the sole legal unit of measure, they only had 25,000 in store. This, combined with the excesses of the Revolution and the high level of illiteracy in 18th century France, made the metric system unpopular.

Napoleon himself ridiculed the metric system but, as an able administrator, recognised the value of a sound basis for a system of measurement. That system reintroduced the names of many units used during the ancient regime, but their values were redefined in terms of metric units. This intermediate step eased the transition to a metric-based system.

However, many units of measure, such as the livre (for half a kilogram), remained in everyday use for many years, and to a residual extent up to this day.

Germany

At the outbreak of the French Revolution, much of modern-day Germany and Austria were part of the Holy Roman Empire which had become a loose federation of kingdoms, principalities, free cities, bishoprics and other fiefdoms, each with its own system of measurement, though in most cases the systems were loosely derived from the Carolingian system instituted by Charlemagne a thousand years earlier.

During the Napoleonic era, some of the German states moved to reform their systems of measurement using the prototype metre and kilogram as the basis of the new units. Baden, in 1810, for example, redefined the Ruthe (rods) as being 3.0 m exactly and defined the subunits of the Ruthe as 1 Ruthe = 10 Fuß (feet) = 100 Zoll (inches) = 1,000 Linie (lines) = 10,000 Punkt (points) while the Pfund was defined as being 500 g, divided into 30 Loth, each of 16.67 g. Bavaria, in its reform of 1811, trimmed the Bavarian Pfund from 561.288 g to 560 g exactly, consisting of 32 Loth, each of 17.5 g while the Prussian Pfund remained at 467.711 g.

After the Congress of Vienna there was a degree of commercial cooperation between the various German states resulting in the German Customs Union (Zollverein). There were, however, still many barriers to trade until Bavaria took the lead in establishing the General German Commercial Code in 1856. As part of the code the Zollverein introduced the Zollpfund (Customs Pound) which was defined to be exactly 500 g and which could be split into 30 'lot'. This unit was used for inter-state movement of goods, but was not applied in all states for internal use.

In 1832, Carl Friedrich Gauss studied the Earth's magnetic field and proposed adding the second to the basic units of the metre and the kilogram in the form of the CGS system (centimetre, gram, second). In 1836, he founded the Magnetischer Verein, the first international scientific association, in collaboration with Alexander von Humboldt and Wilhelm Edouard Weber. Geophysics or the study of the Earth by the means of physics preceded physics and contributed to the development of its methods. It was primarily a natural philosophy whose object was the study of natural phenomena such as the Earth's magnetic field, lightning and gravity. The coordination of the observation of geophysical phenomena in different points of the globe was of paramount importance and was at the origin of the creation of the first international scientific associations. The foundation of the Magnetischer Verein would be followed by that of the Central European Arc Measurement (German: Mitteleuropaïsche Gradmessung) on the initiative of Johann Jacob Baeyer in 1863, and by that of the International Meteorological Organisation whose second president, the Swiss meteorologist and physicist, Heinrich von Wild represented Russia at the International Committee for Weights and Measures (CIPM). In 1867, the European Arc Measurement (German: Europäische Gradmessung) called for the creation of a new, international prototype metre (IPM) and the arrangement of a system where national standards could be compared with it. The French government gave practical support to the creation of an International Metre Commission, which met in Paris in 1870 and again in 1872 with the participation of about thirty countries. The Metre Convention was signed on 20 May 1875 in Paris and the International Bureau of Weights and Measures was created under the supervision of the CIPM.

Although the Zollverein collapsed after the Austro-Prussian War of 1866, the metric system became the official system of measurement in the newly formed German Empire in 1872 and of Austria in 1875. The Zollpfund ceased to be legal in Germany after 1877.

Italy

The Cisalpine Republic, a North Italian republic set up by Napoleon in 1797 with its capital at Milan first adopted a modified form of the metric system based in the braccio cisalpino (Cisalpine cubit) which was defined to be half a metre. In 1802 the Cisalpine Republic was renamed the Italian Republic, with Napoleon as its head of state. The following year the Cisalpine system of measure was replaced by the metric system.

In 1806, the Italian Republic was replaced by the Kingdom of Italy with Napoleon as its emperor. By 1812, all of Italy from Rome northwards was under the control of Napoleon, either as French Departments or as part of the Kingdom of Italy ensuring the metric system was in use throughout this region.

After the Congress of Vienna, the various Italian states reverted to their original system of measurements, but in 1845 the Kingdom of Piedmont and Sardinia passed legislation to introduce the metric system within five years. By 1860, most of Italy had been unified under the King of Sardinia Victor Emmanuel II and under Law 132 of 28 July 1861 the metric system became the official system of measurement throughout the kingdom. Numerous Tavole di ragguaglio (Conversion Tables) were displayed in shops until 31 December 1870.

Netherlands
The Netherlands (as the revolutionary Batavian Republic) began to use the metric system from 1799 but, as with its co-revolutionaries in France, encountered numerous practical difficulties. Subsequently, as part of the First French Empire since 1809, the Netherlands used Napoloeon's  from their introduction in 1812 until the fall of his Empire in 1815.

Norway 
In 1875, Norway was the first country to ratify the metre convention, and it was seen as an important step for Norway to gain independence. The decision to adopt the metric system is said to have been the Norwegian Parliament's fastest decision in peace time.

Portugal
In August 1814, Portugal officially adopted the metric system but with the names of the units substituted by Portuguese traditional ones. In this system the basic units were the mão-travessa (hand) = 1 decimetre (10 mão-travessas = 1 vara (yard) = 1 metre), the canada = 1 litre and the libra (pound) = 1 kilogram.

Spain

Until the ascent of the Bourbon monarchy in Spain in 1700, each region of Spain had its own system of measurement. The new Bourbon monarchy tried to centralise control and with it the system of measurement. There were debates regarding the desirability of retaining the Castilian units of measure or, in the interests of harmonisation, adopting the French system. Although Spain assisted Méchain in his meridian survey, the Government feared the French revolutionary movement and reinforced the Castilian units of measure to counter such movements. By 1849 however, it proved difficult to maintain the old system and in that year the metric system became the legal system of measure in Spain.

The Spanish Royal Academy of Science urged the Government to approve the creation of a large-scale map of Spain in 1852. The following year Carlos Ibáñez e Ibáñez de Ibero was appointed to undertake this task. All the scientific and technical material had to be created. Ibáñez e Ibáñez de Ibero and Saavedra went to Paris to supervise the production by Brunner of a measuring instrument which they had devised and which they later compared with Borda's double-toise N°1 which was the main reference for measuring all geodetic bases in France and whose length was by definition 3.8980732 metres at a specified temperature.

In 1865 the triangulation of Spain was connected with that of Portugal and France. In 1866 at the conference of the Association of Geodesy in Neuchâtel, Ibáñez announced that Spain would collaborate in remeasuring the French meridian arc. In 1879 Ibáñez and François Perrier (representing France) completed the junction between the geodetic network of Spain and Algeria and thus completed the measurement of the French meridian arc which extended from Shetland to the Sahara.

In 1866, Spain and Portugal joined the Central European Arc Measurement which would become the European Arc Measurement the next year. In 1867 at the second general conference of the geodetic association held in Berlin, the question of an international standard unit of length was discussed in order to combine the measurements made in different countries to determine the size and shape of the Earth. The conference proposed according to recommendations drawn up by a committee chaired by Otto Wilhelm von Struve director of the Pulkovo Observatory in St. Petersburg the adoption of the metre and the creation of an international metre commission, after a preliminary discussion held in Neuchâtel between Johann Jacob Baeyer director of the Royal Prussian Geodetic Institute, Adolphe Hirsch founder of the Neuchâtel Observatory and Carlos Ibáñez e Ibáñez de Ibero Spanish representative, founder and first director of the Instituto Geográfico Nacional.
In November 1869 the French government issued invitations to join this commission. Spain accepted and Carlos Ibáñez e Ibáñez de Ibero took part in the Committee of preparatory research from the first meeting of the International Metre Commission in 1870. He became president of the permanent Committee of the International Metre Commission in 1872. In 1874 he was elected as president of the Permanent Commission of the European Arc Measurement. He also presided the General Conference of the European Arc Measurement held in Paris in 1875, when the association decided the creation of an international geodetic standard for the bases' measurement. He represented Spain at the 1875 conference of the Metre Convention, which was ratified the same year in Paris. The Spanish geodesist was elected as the first president of the International Committee for Weights and Measures. His activities resulted in the distribution of a platinum and iridium prototype of the metre to all States parties to the Metre Convention during the first meeting of the General Conference on Weights and Measures in 1889. These prototypes defined the metre right up until 1960.

Switzerland 

In 1801, the Helvetic Republic at the instigation of Johann Georg Tralles promulgated a law introducing the metric system which was never applied, because in 1803 the competence for weights and measures returned to the cantons. On the territory of the current canton of Jura, then annexed to France (Mont-Terrible), the metre was adopted in 1800. Canton of Geneva adopted the metric system in 1813, canton of Vaud in 1822, canton of Valais in 1824 and canton of Neuchâtel in 1857. Twelve cantons of the Swiss Plateau and the north-east adopted in 1835 a concordat based on the federal foot (exactly 0.3 m) which entered in force in 1836. The cantons of central and eastern Switzerland, as well as the Alpine cantons continued to use the old measures.

Guillaume-Henri Dufour founded in 1838 in Geneva a topographic office (future Federal Office of topography), which published under his direction, from 1845 to 1864, the first official map of Switzerland, on the basis of new cantonal measurements. This map at 1: 100,000 engraved on copper, suggested the relief by hatching and shadows. The Map projection adopted by the commission was the Bonne projection. Its center would be the Bern Observatory (5° 6' 10.8'' E of Paris meridian), although this point was much closer to the western end of Switzerland than to its eastern end. But its position was well known, and there was no more central observatory. The scale was set at one hundred thousandth because it was considered more suitable for a country as rugged as Switzerland than that of the eighty thousandth adopted for the large map of France. There was no reason to adopt this one, because the meridians of the map of Switzerland tilting in the opposite direction to those of the map of France, it was not possible to make the connection which, in the eyes of a few people, seemed desirable. The map commission wanted to adopt decimal measures; and Switzerland did not have a map made previously which, like that of Cassini, could involve keeping a scale which did not deviate too much from that of a line for one hundred toises, or the eighty-six thousand and four hundredth. The metre was adopted as a linear measure, and the entire map was divided into twenty-five sheets: five in length or east to west, and five in height. Each sheet must have carried two scales, one purely metric, the other in Swiss leagues 4800 metres in length. The frame would be divided into sexagesimal minutes and centesimal minutes; the latters, each subdivided into ten parts, provide the advantage of showing kilometers in the direction of the meridians; so that there are new scales on the sides of the sheet to appreciate the distances.

According to the 1848 Constitution the federal foot was to come into force throughout the country. In Geneva, a committee chaired by Guillaume Henri Dufour militated in favor of maintaining the decimal metric system in the French-speaking cantons and against the standardization of weights and measures in Switzerland on the basis of the metric foot. In 1868 the metric system was legalized alongside the federal foot, which was a first step towards its definitive introduction. Cantonal calibrators were supervised by a Federal Bureau of Verification created in 1862, whose management was entrusted to Heinrich von Wild from 1864. In 1875, the competence for weights and measures was assigned to the Confederation and Switzerland represented by Adolphe Hirsch joined the Metre Convention. The same year a federal law imposed the metric system from 1 January 1877. In 1977, Switzerland joined the International System of Units.

United Kingdom

In 1824 the Weights and Measures Act imposed one standard 'imperial' system of weights and measures on the British Empire. The effect of this act was to standardise existing British units of measure rather than to align them with the metric system.

During the next eighty years a number of Parliamentary select committees recommended the adoption of the metric system, each with a greater degree of urgency, but Parliament prevaricated. A Select Committee report of 1862 recommended compulsory metrication, but with an "Intermediate permissive phase"; Parliament responded in 1864 by legalising metric units only for 'contracts and dealings'. The United Kingdom initially declined to sign the Treaty of the Metre, but did so in 1883. Meanwhile, British scientists and technologists were at the forefront of the metrication movement – it was the British Association for the Advancement of Science that promoted the CGS system of units as a coherent system and it was the British firm Johnson Matthey that was accepted by the CGPM in 1889 to cast the international prototype metre and kilogram.

In 1895 another Parliamentary select committee recommended the compulsory adoption of the metric system after a two-year permissive period. The 1897 Weights and Measures Act legalised the metric units for trade, but did not make them mandatory. A bill to make the metric system compulsory in order to enable the British industrial base to fight off the challenge of the nascent German base passed through the House of Lords in 1904, but did not pass in the House of Commons before the next general election was called. Following opposition by the Lancashire cotton industry, a similar bill was defeated in 1907 in the House of Commons by 150 votes to 118.

In the United Kingdom metric is the official system for most regulated trading by weight or measure purposes, but some imperial units remain the primary official unit of measurement. For example, miles, yards, and feet remain the official units for road signage – and use of imperial units is widespread.  The Imperial pint also remains a permitted unit for milk in returnable bottles and for draught beer and cider in British pubs. Imperial units are also legal for use alongside metric units on food packaging and price indications for goods sold loose, and may be used exclusively where a product is sold by description, rather than by weight/mass/volume: e.g. television screen and clothing sizes tend to be denominated in inches only, but a piece of material priced per inch would be unlawful unless the metric price was also shown.

Most of the general public still measure their height and weight in imperial units, and imperial units are the norm when discussing longer distances such as journeys by car, but otherwise metric measurements are often used.

United States

In 1805 a Swiss geodesist Ferdinand Rudolph Hassler brought copies of the French metre and kilogram to the United States. In 1830 the Congress decided to create uniform standards for length and weight in the United States. Hassler was mandated to work out the new standards and proposed to adopt the metric system. The Congress opted for the British Parliamentary Standard from 1758 and the Troy Pound of Great Britain from 1824 as length and weight standards. Nevertheless, the primary baseline of the US Coast Survey was measured in 1834 at Fire Island using four two-metre iron bars constructed after Hassler's specification in the United Kingdom and brought back in the United States in 1815. All distances measured in the US National Geodetic Survey were referred to the metre. In 1866 the United States Congress passed a bill making it lawful to use the metric system in the United States. The bill, which was permissive rather than mandatory in nature, defined the metric system in terms of customary units rather than with reference to the international prototype metre and kilogram. Ferdinand Rudolph Hassler's use of the metre in coastal survey, which had been an argument for the introduction of the Metric Act of 1866 allowing the use of the metre in the United States, probably also played a role in the choice of the metre as international scientific unit of length and the proposal by the European Arc Measurement (German: Europäische Gradmessung) to “establish a European international bureau for weights and measures”.

By 1893, the reference standards for customary units had become unreliable. Moreover, the United States, being a signatory of the Metre Convention was in possession of national prototype metres and kilograms that were calibrated against those in use elsewhere in the world. This led to the Mendenhall Order which redefined the customary units by referring to the national metric prototypes, but used the conversion factors of the 1866 act.  In 1896 a bill that would make the metric system mandatory in the United States was presented to Congress. Twenty-three of the 29 people who gave evidence before the congressional committee who were considering the bill were in favor of it, but six were against. Four of these six dissenters represented manufacturing interests and the other two were from the United States Revenue service. The grounds cited were the cost and inconvenience of the change-over. The bill was not enacted. Subsequent bills suffered a similar fate.

The United States mandated the acceptance of the metric system in 1866 for commercial and legal proceedings, without displacing their customary units.  The non-mandatory nature of the adoption of the SI has resulted in a much slower pace of adoption in the US than in other countries.

In 1971 the US National Bureau of Standards completed a three-year study of the impact of increasing worldwide metric use on the US. The study concluded with a report to Congress entitled A Metric America – A Decision Whose Time Has Come. Since then metric use has increased in the US, principally in the manufacturing and educational sectors. Public Law 93-380, enacted 21 August 1974, states that it is the policy of the US to encourage educational agencies and institutions to prepare students to use the metric system of measurement with ease and facility as a part of the regular education program. On 23 December 1975, President Gerald Ford signed Public Law 94–168, the Metric Conversion Act of 1975. This act declares a national policy of coordinating the increasing use of the metric system in the US. It established a US Metric Board whose functions as of 1 October 1982 were transferred to the Dept of Commerce, Office of Metric Programs, to coordinate the voluntary conversion to the metric system.

In January 2007 NASA decided to use metric units for all future moon missions, in line with the practice of other space agencies.

Other English-speaking countries

The British metrication programme signalled the start of metrication programmes elsewhere in the Commonwealth, though India had started its programme in 1959, six years before the United Kingdom. South Africa (then not a member of the Commonwealth) set up a Metrication Advisory Board in 1967, New Zealand set up its Metric Advisory Board in 1969, Australia passed the Metric Conversion Act in 1970 and Canada appointed a Metrication Commission in 1971. 

Metrication in Australia, New Zealand and South Africa was essentially complete within a decade, while in Canada metrication has been halted since the 1970s. In that country, the square foot is still widespread for commercial and residential advertisements and partially in construction because of the close trade relations with the United States. Metric measurements on food products such as canned food are often merely the equivalent of the still widely used imperial units of measurement such as the ounce and the pound. Butter is everywhere sold in 454 g packagings, which is the equivalent of one pound. The railways of Canada such as the Canadian National and Canadian Pacific as well as commuter rail services continue to measure their trackage in miles and speed limits in miles per hour because they also operate in the United States (although urban railways including subways and light rail have adopted kilometres and kilometres per hour). Canadian railcars show weight figures in both imperial and metric. Most other Commonwealth countries adopted the metric system during the 1970s.

Apart from the United Kingdom and Canada, which have effectively halted their metrication programs, the great majority of countries using the imperial system have completed official metrication during the second half of the 20th century or the first decade of the 21st century. The most recent to complete this process was the Republic of Ireland, which began metric conversion in the 1970s and completed it in early 2005. Hong Kong uses three systems (traditional, Imperial and metric) and all three are permitted for use in trade.

Chronology
The metric system was officially introduced in France in December 1799. In the 19th century, the metric system was adopted by almost all European countries: Portugal (1814); 
Netherlands, Belgium and Luxembourg (1820); Switzerland (1835); Spain (1850s); Italy (1861); Romania (1864); Germany (1870, legally from 1 January 1872); and Austria-Hungary (1876, but the law was adopted in 1871). Thailand did not formally adopt the metric system until 1923, but the Royal Thai Survey Department used it for cadastral survey as early as 1896. Denmark and Iceland adopted the metric system in 1907.

Status by country/region

Links in the country/region point to articles about metrication in that country/region.

Notes

There are three common ways that nations convert from traditional measurement systems to the metric system. The first is the quick or "Big-Bang" route. The second way is to phase in units over time and progressively outlaw traditional units. This method, favoured by some industrial nations, is slower and generally less complete. The third way is to redefine traditional units in metric terms. This has been used successfully where traditional units were ill-defined and had regional variations.

The "Big-Bang" way is to simultaneously outlaw the use of pre-metric measurement, metricate, reissue all government publications and laws, and change education systems to metric.  India was the first Commonwealth country to use this method of conversion. Its changeover lasted from 1 April 1960, when metric measurements became legal, to 1 April 1962, when all other systems were banned. The Indian model was extremely successful and was copied over much of the developing world.  Two industrialized Commonwealth countries, Australia and New Zealand, also did a quick conversion to metric.

The phase-in way is to pass a law permitting the use of metric units in parallel with traditional ones, followed by education of metric units, then progressively ban the use of the older measures.  This has generally been a slow route to metric.  The British Empire permitted the use of metric measures in 1873, but the changeover was not completed in most Commonwealth countries other than India and Australia until the 1970s and 1980s when governments took an active role in metric conversion.  In the United Kingdom and Canada, the process is still incomplete.  Japan also followed this route and did not complete the changeover for 70 years.  By law, loose goods sold with reference to units of quantity have to be weighed and sold using the metric system.  In 2001, the EU directive 80/181/EEC stated that supplementary units (imperial units alongside metric including labelling on packages) would become illegal from the beginning of 2010.  In September 2007, a consultation process was started which resulted in the directive being modified to permit supplementary units to be used indefinitely.

The third method is to redefine traditional units in terms of metric values.  These redefined "quasi-metric" units often stay in use long after metrication is said to have been completed.  Resistance to metrication in post-revolutionary France convinced Napoleon to revert to mesures usuelles (usual measures), and, to some extent, the names remain throughout Europe.  In 1814, Portugal adopted the metric system, but with the names of the units substituted by Portuguese traditional ones.  In this system, the basic units were the mão-travessa (hand) = 1 decimetre (10 mão-travessas = 1 vara (yard) = 1 metre), the canada = 1 litre and the libra (pound) = 1 kilogram.  In the Netherlands, 500 g is informally referred to as a pond (pound) and 100 g as an ons (ounce), and in Germany and France, 500 g is informally referred to respectively as ein Pfund and une livre ("one pound").  

In Denmark, the re-defined pund (500 g) is occasionally used, particularly among older people and (older) fruit growers, since these were originally paid according to the number of pounds of fruit produced.  In Sweden and Norway, a mil (Scandinavian mile) is informally equal to 10 km, and this has continued to be the predominantly used unit in conversation when referring to geographical distances.  In the 19th century, Switzerland had a non-metric system completely based on metric terms (e.g. 1 Fuss (foot) = 30 cm, 1 Zoll (inch) = 3 cm, 1 Linie (line) = 3 mm).  In China, the jin now has a value of 500 g and the liang is 50 g.

It is difficult to judge the degree to which ordinary people change to using metric in their daily lives.  In countries that have recently changed, older segments of the population tend to still use the older units.  Also, local variations abound in which units are round metric quantities or not.  In Canada, for example, ovens and cooking temperatures are usually measured in degrees Fahrenheit and Celsius.  Except for in cases of import items, all recipes and packaging include both Celsius and Fahrenheit, so Canadians are typically comfortable with both systems of measurement.  This extends to manufacturing, where companies are able to use both imperial and metric units, since the major export market is the US, but metric is required for both domestic use and for nearly all other exports.  This may be due to the overwhelming influence of the neighbouring United States; similarly, many Canadians still often use non-metric measurements in day-to-day discussions of height and weight, though most driver's licences and other official government documents record weight and height only in metric (Saskatchewan driver licences, prior to the introduction of the current one-piece licence, indicated height in feet and inches but have switched to centimetres following the new licence format).  

In Canadian schools, metric is the standard, except when it comes up in recipes, where both are included, or in practical lessons involving measuring wood or other materials for manufacturing.  In the United Kingdom, degrees Fahrenheit are seldom encountered (except when some people talk about hot summer weather), while other metric units are often used in conjunction with older measurements, and road signs use miles rather than kilometres.  Another example is "hard" and "soft" metric:  Canada converted liquid dairy products to litre, 500 mL, and 250 mL sizes, which caused some complaining at the time of the conversion, as a litre of milk is slightly over 35 imperial fluid ounces, while the former imperial quart used in Canada was 40 ounces.  This is an example of a "hard" metric conversion.  Conversely, butter in Canada is sold primarily in a 454 g package, which converts to one Imperial pound. Similarly, one of the standard sizes of some liquor bottles is 1.14 litres, which translates to 40 ounces (one Imperial/Canadian quart). This is considered a "soft" metric conversion.

In Ireland, metric is the official unit of measurement though most people would not understand metric units for measuring the body, distances or area. Conversely British imperial units would generally not be understood for temperature. For non-body weights, metric is gradually replacing imperial in everyday use, possibly due to weights on packaging being in metric.

Exceptions

, the metric system predominates in most of the world; some traditional units, however, are still used in many places in specific industries. For example:
Photograph and video cameras are standardised to mount to tripods using -20 and -16 screws, which are dimensioned in inches, by ISO 1222:2010.
Tyre pressure is commonly measured in pounds per square inch in multiple countries, including Argentina, Australia, Brazil, Canada, Chile, India, Ireland, Mexico, Peru, the United Kingdom, and the United States.
Engine power is usually measured in horsepower in most former USSR countries and German-speaking countries (this is metric horsepower rather than mechanical horsepower), although in the EU from 2010 the horsepower is permitted only as a supplementary unit. In Sweden, ICE power is advertised in horsepower, while electric motors are in watts.
In Hong Kong, some types of trade usually use traditional Chinese and imperial units instead of metric units.
Office space and housing space is often sold and rented in square feet in Hong Kong, Singapore, Malaysia, Canada and India, square yards in India, Pakistan and Bangladesh, and tsubo/pyeong/"ping" in Japan, Korea, and Taiwan.

In plumbing, some pipes and pipe threads are still designated in inch sizes due to historic international acceptance of particular sequences of pipe sizes and pipe threads, such as BSP/ISO 7/EN 10226 threads.
In the United Kingdom and some Commonwealth states, temperatures of domestic gas ovens are often displayed in gas marks. Similarly, old French ovens and recipe books often use a scale based on the Fahrenheit scale, called Thermostats (Th), where Th 1 equals 100 °F, increasing by 50 °F for each integer on the scale.
Car and bicycle rim diametres are still usually set as whole inch measurements, with tyre widths are measured in millimetres.
Dots per inch and pixels per inch are still used to describe graphical resolution with computers and printing.
Data density for magnetic tape data storage is measured bits per inch for density and bits per square inch for area density.
Thread count is frequently measured in threads per inch.
Abrasives, such as sandpaper or sharpening stones, are commonly graded by grit, corresponding to mesh size per square inch.
Digital display sizes are usually advertised diagonally, using inches, along with centimetres supplementarily; however, in France and South Africa, centimetres are often used for TVs, whereas LCD monitors are measured in inches.
Many large-format computer printers have carriage widths measured in inches. While metric media sizes are often quoted (e.g. A0, A1), rolls of film, plain paper or photographic paper are normally sold in these widths, creating waste when they are trimmed. Rolls lengths are variously advertised in feet or metres.
Inch-based spare parts are occasionally be kept to service American and pre-1950s machines, but screws are changed to metric thread at maintenance.
In Ireland, the only legal exceptions is the mandatory use of the imperial pint for the sale of draught beer and cidre. Precious metals may be sold in troy ounces and supplementary imperial units are permitted alongside metric units on goods. Height and width road signs are usually in feet and inches and metres, or just feet and inches.
In Australia, pints are still used for beer (redefined to 570 ml (see Australian beer glasses)).
McDonald's sells Quarter Pounders under its original name in all English-speaking countries despite metrication. In the Netherlands and Finland, it is known as a Quarter Pounder Cheese while Sweden also refers to it as QP Cheese. In Quebec, it is called a Quart de livre. In Latin America and Spain, it is called Cuarto de Libra con Queso. In Taiwan, it is known as the four-ounce beef burger.
Surfboards are usually designed, constructed, and sold in feet and inches.  
In the Philippines, some pre-metric units are still used, e.g., the quiñón for area.
In many countries, non-metric units are sometimes used to give approximate measurements.
Golf courses are measured in yards in the United States, Canada, Japan, South Korea, China, Thailand, the Philippines, Venezuela, Colombia, the Dominican Republic, Indonesia, Vietnam, and Cambodia. In the United Kingdom and Ireland, some golf courses are measured in yards while others are measured in metres.
Imperial gallons are still used for the sale of fuel in four British Overseas Territories – Anguilla, the British Virgin Islands, the Cayman Islands, and Montserrat – and six states – Antigua and Barbuda, Dominica, Grenada, Saint Christopher and Nevis, Saint Lucia, and Saint Vincent and the Grenadines.
In the United Kingdom, fuel economy is commonly advertised in miles per imperial gallon.
United States gallons are used in the United States and its territories (except for Puerto Rico, which has used litres since 1980), the Bahamas, Belize, Colombia, the Dominican Republic, Ecuador, Guatemala, Haiti, Honduras, Liberia, Peru, and the Turks and Caicos Islands.
Distance and speed limit signs are still displayed in miles and miles per hour in the United States, United Kingdom, Burma, and multiple Caribbean states.
Precious metals are often sold in troy ounces, even in mostly metric states.
Heating, air conditioning, and gas cooking appliances often display power in British thermal units per hour (BTU/h) in the United States, and occasionally the United Kingdom.

In some countries (such as Antigua and Barbuda, see above), the transition is still in progress. The Caribbean island nation of Saint Lucia announced metrication programmes in 2005 to be compatible with CARICOM, however this transition has been effectively halted due to road signage and the sale of fuel, among other aspects, still being in imperial.

United Kingdom

In the United Kingdom, some of the population continues to resist metrication to varying degrees. The traditional imperial measures are preferred by a majority and continue to have widespread use in some applications. The metric system is used by most businesses, and is used for most trade transactions. Metric units must be used for certain trading activities (selling by weight or measure for example), although imperial units may continue to be displayed in parallel.

British law has enacted the provisions of European Union directive 80/181/EEC, which catalogues the units of measure that may be used for "economic, public health, public safety and administrative purposes". These units consist of the recommendations of the General Conference on Weights and Measures, supplemented by some additional units of measure that may be used for specified purposes. Metric units could be legally used for trading purposes for nearly a century before metrication efforts began in earnest. The government had been making preparations for the conversion of the Imperial unit since the 1862 Select Committee on Weights and Measures recommended the conversion and the Weights and Measures Act of 1864 and the Weights and Measures (Metric System) Act of 1896 legalised the metric system. 

In 1965, with lobbying from British industries and the prospects of joining the Common Market, the government set a 10-year target for full conversion, and created the Metrication Board in 1969. Metrication occurred in some areas during this time period, including the re-surveying of Ordnance Survey maps in 1970, decimalisation of the currency in 1971, and teaching the metric system in schools. No plans were made to make the use of the metric system compulsory, and the Metrication Board was abolished in 1980 following a change in government.

The United Kingdom avoided having to comply with the 1989 European Units of Measurement Directive (89/617/EEC), which required all member states to make the metric system compulsory, by negotiating derogations (delayed switchovers), including for miles on road signs and for pints for draught beer, cider, and milk sales.

Immediately following the United Kingdom's vote to withdraw from the European Union, it was reported that some retailers requested to revert to imperial units, with some reverting without permission. A poll following the 2016 vote also found that 45% of Britons sought to revert to selling produce in imperial units.

The UK government started a biased consultation on 3 June 2022 on the choice of units of measurement markings.

Imperial units remain in common everyday use for human body measurements, in particular stones and pounds for weight, and feet and inches for height.

United States

Over time, the metric system has influenced the United States through international trade and standardisation. The use of the metric system was made legal as a system of measurement in 1866 and the United States was a founding member of the International Bureau of Weights and Measures in 1875. The system was officially adopted by the federal government in 1975 for use in the military and government agencies, and as preferred system for trade and commerce. Attempts in the 1990s to make it mandatory for federal and state road signage to use metric units failed and it remains voluntary.

A 1992 amendment to the Fair Packaging and Labeling Act (FPLA), which took effect in 1994, required labels on federally regulated "consumer commodities" to include both metric and US customary units. As of 2013, all but one US state (New York) have passed laws permitting metric-only labels for the products they regulate.

After many years of informal or optional metrication, the American public and much of the private business and industry still use US customary units today. At least two states, Kentucky and California, have even moved towards demetrication of highway construction projects.

Canada

Canada legally allows for dual labelling of goods provided that the metric unit is listed first and that there is a distinction of whether a liquid measure is a US or a Canadian (Imperial) unit.

Air and sea transportation

Air and sea transportation commonly use the nautical mile. This is about one minute of arc of latitude along any meridian arc and it is precisely defined as 1 852 metres (about 1.151 miles). It is not an SI unit. The prime unit of speed or velocity for maritime and air navigation remains the knot (nautical mile per hour).

The prime unit of measure for aviation (altitude, or flight level) is usually estimated based on air pressure values, and in many countries, it is still described in nominal feet, although many others employ nominal metres.  The policies of the International Civil Aviation Organization (ICAO) relating to measurement are:

there should be a single system of units throughout the world
the single system should be the SI
the use of the foot for altitude is a permitted variation.

Consistent with ICAO policy, aviation has undergone a significant amount of metrication over the years. For example, runway lengths are usually given in metres. The United States metricated the data interchange format (METAR) for temperature reports in 1996, and since indicates temperature in Celsius. Metrication is also gradually taking place in cargo mass and dimensions and in fuel volume and mass.

In former Soviet countries and China, the metric system is used in aviation (whereby in Russia altitudes above the transition level are given in feet). Sailplanes use the metric system in many European countries.

In 1975, the assembly of the International Maritime Organization (IMO) decided that future conventions of the International Convention for the Safety of Life at Sea (SOLAS) and other future IMO instruments should use SI units only.

Accidents and incidents
Confusion over units during the process of metrication can sometimes lead to accidents. In 1983, an Air Canada Boeing 767, nicknamed the "Gimli Glider" following the incident, ran out of fuel in midflight.  The incident was caused, in a large part, by the confusion over the conversion between litres, kilograms, and pounds, resulting in the aircraft receiving  of fuel instead of the required .

While not strictly an example of national metrication, the use of two different systems was a contributing factor in the loss of the Mars Climate Orbiter in 1999. The National Aeronautics and Space Administration (NASA) specified metric units in the contract. NASA and other organisations worked in metric units, but one subcontractor, Lockheed Martin, provided thruster performance data to the team in pound force-seconds instead of newton-seconds. As a result, it burned up in the Martian atmosphere.

See also
 Metrication opposition
 Change management, a field studying how changes can be efficiently implemented in modern communities
 Conversion of units
 Metric engine (American expression)
 Language reform
 Metre Convention
 Preferred numbers
 Spread of the Latin script
 Decimalisation

References

External links